Kiryat Malakhi (also Qiryat Malakhi or Kiryat Malachi) is a city in  the Southern District of Israel,  from Ashkelon. Its jurisdiction is 4,632 dunams (~4.6 km2).

History
Kiryat Malakhi, literally "City of Angels", was established in 1951 as a ma'abara, or tent city, to house the masses of Jewish immigrants who arrived during the early days of the state, many of them part of the Jewish exodus from Arab and Muslim countries. The name was chosen to honor the Jewish community of Los Angeles, which contributed much of the funding for its establishment. 

Kiryat Malakhi later became one of several development towns in the Negev.

Moshe Katsav, later Israel's eighth president, was elected mayor in 1969 at the age of 24. His younger brother, Lior Katsav, was also mayor of Kiryat Malakhi, whilst Yosef Vanunu held the post from 1981 until the 1990s. The current mayor is Eliyahu (Lalo) Zohar.

On 15 November 2012, rocket attacks from Gazan terrorists killed three Jewish residents of the city during Operation Pillar of Defense.

Demographics

The arrival of new immigrants from the former Soviet Union and from Ethiopia in recent years has increased the population of Kiryat Malakhi by 40 percent. Some 22,000 people now live in the city. In January 2012, Israeli television publicized a case of a seller in the municipality creating a restrictive covenant barring the sale or lease of property to Ethiopians. The case led to public outcry and demonstrations of hundreds of people, and caused the Association for Civil Rights in Israel to call on the Registrar of Real Estate to revoke the licence of real estate agents who practice such discrimination.

Income
According to CBS figures for 2000, there were 5,692 salaried workers and 458 self-employed persons in Kiryat Malakhi. The mean monthly wage for a salaried worker was 3,513 shekels, a real change of –3.4% over the course of 2000. Salaried men earned an average of 4,558 shekels (a real change of –3.1%) compared to 2,405 shekels for females (a real change of –4.9%). The mean income for the self-employed was 5,471. There were 472 people receiving unemployment benefits and 3,301 people eligible for income supplements.

There is a 1000 people football stadium named "Teddy Arena". The club Maccabi Kiryat Malakhi plays there.

Transportation
Kiryat Malakhi's main transportation hub is Malakhi Junction (also known as Qastina, after the pre-state Arab village that was located here).

Education
According to CBS, there are 15 schools and 4,909 students in the city. They are spread out as 10 elementary schools and 2,867 elementary school students, and 2 high schools and 2,042 high school students. 47.9% of 12th grade students were entitled to a matriculation certificate in 2001.

Twin towns – sister cities
Kiryat Malakhi is twinned with:
 Piatra Neamț, Romania
 Rueil-Malmaison, France
 Golmud, China

References

External links

 

Development towns
Cities in Southern District (Israel)
Populated places established in 1951
1951 establishments in Israel